Moses Woodruff Dodd (November 11, 1813 – April 8, 1899) was the founder of a publishing company that eventually became Dodd, Mead and Company in New York City.

Biography
He was the son of Ira Dodd (1786–1869) and Anna Harrison (1785–1867) of Bloomfield, New Jersey. After graduation at Princeton in 1837, he entered the Princeton Theological Seminary, but he did not graduate because of his health problems. In 1839, he formed a partnership with John S. Taylor, a publisher of New York City. When Taylor retired in 1840, Dodd continued the business under the name of M. W. Dodd until his retirement in 1870.

He died on April 8, 1899.

Family
He had the following siblings:
Mary Kingsland Dodd (1811–1833)
Phebe Pierson Dodd (1816–1894)
Amarintha Dodd (1821–1889).

He married Rachel Hoe (1817–1897) and had the following children:
Ira Seymour Dodd (1842–1922)
Frank Howard Dodd (1844–1916) who took control of the company at his father's retirement.
Charles Townley Dodd (1846–1917)
Robert Hoe Dodd (1848–1934)
William Mead Dodd (1851–1928) who married Jean MacNeill 
Edward Winslow Dodd (1853)
Dodd's granddaughter, Marion Elza Dodd, co-founded the Hampshire Bookshop in Northampton, Massachusetts.

Notes

References

1813 births
1899 deaths
American publishers (people)
Princeton University alumni
Princeton Theological Seminary alumni
19th-century American businesspeople